Alda-1 is an organic compound that enhances the enzymatic activity of human ALDH2. Alda-1 has been proposed as a potential treatment for the alcohol flush reaction experienced by people with genetically deficient ALDH2.

Mechanism of action
Ethanol is metabolized to acetaldehyde in people, which is then metabolized to acetic acid primarily by ALDH2. People have various ALDH2 alleles. ALDH2*1 is a common allele (wild type), but about 40% of people of East Asian ethnicity have one or two copies of the dominant ALDH2*2 instead, which causes ALDH2 deficiency. If deficient people drink ethanol, they suffer from alcohol flush reaction due to acetaldehyde accumulation.

Four Alda-1 molecules bind to each monomer of ALDH2 tetramer. This enhances NAD+ binding to ALDH2. NAD+ is required by ALDH2 for its enzymatic activity, which is why Alda-1 increases ALHD2 activity by 2.1 fold if ALDH2 is coded by ALDH2*1 and by 11 fold if it is coded ALDH2*2.

History
Chen et al. first reported Alda-1 in 2008. Alda-1 is the first known aldehyde dehydrogenase activator.

References 

Benzamides
Benzodioxoles
Chloroarenes